Happy Deathday is the second album of the Greek metal band Saddolls. This album was the band's
first major opening in the European countries when the first single Bloodred was included at Sonic Seducer's compilation album Cold Hands Seduction Vol.128. The album also features some guest musicians from bands such as HIM To/Die/For Scar Symmetry Mandragora Scream and Seduce The Heaven.

rack listing

Band personnel 
 George Downloved – vocals
 Paul Evilrose – guitar
 Daniel Aven – guitar
 Mary McBlood - bass
 St. Gus - drums

Guest musicians:
 Elina Laivera - female vocals
 Jape Peratalo - guest vocals
 Roberth Karlsson - screams and growls
 Sakis Darkface - screams and growls
 Manos Fatsis - backing vocals
 John Soti - backing vocals
 Duffy - backing vocals
 Alex Flouros - additional guitars
 John McRis - additional guitars and keyboards
 M-Teo (Teo Buzz) - keyboards

Production personnel 
John McRis – Mastering
Mironized – Design
John McRis – Engineer
Nick Papadopoulos – Mixing

Videos

References

2012 albums
Saddolls albums